The 2015–16 North Texas Mean Green women's basketball team represents the University of North Texas during the 2015–16 NCAA Division I women's basketball season. The Mean Green, led by first year head coach Jalie Mitchell, play their home games UNT Coliseum, also known as The Super Pit, and were third year members of Conference USA. They finished the season 11–19, 5–13 in C-USA play to finish in thirteenth place. They advanced to the second round of the C-USA women's tournament to Old Dominion.

Roster

Schedule

|-
!colspan=9 style="background:#059033; color:#000000;"| Exhibition

|-
!colspan=9 style="background:#059033; color:#000000;"| Non-conference regular Season

|-
!colspan=9 style="background:#059033; color:#000000;"| Conference USA regular Season

|-
!colspan="9" style="background:#059033; color:#000000;"| Conference USA Women's Tournament

See also
 2015–16 North Texas Mean Green men's basketball team

References

North Texas Mean Green women's basketball seasons
North Texas
North Texas
North Texas